Smida River may refer to:
 Smida, a tributary of the Vornic in Caraș-Severin County, Romania
 Smida, a tributary of the Muncel in Hunedoara County, Romania
 Smida, a tributary of the Ața in Neamț County, Romania